The Loma Candela Formation is a geologic formation in Cuba. It preserves fossils dating back to the Paleogene period.

Description 
The formation consists of limestones, yellowish calcareous marls and coastal conglomerates and fine calcareous sandstones. The Loma Candela Formation was deposited in a marine environment. It overlies the Universidad Formation and is correlated with the Tallahassee and Lake City Formations of Florida.

Fossil content 
 Histocidaris sanchezi
 Prionocidaris loveni
 Tylocidaris bermudezi

See also 
 List of fossiliferous stratigraphic units in Cuba

References

Further reading 
 
 B. M. Cutress. 1980. Cretaceous and Tertiary Cidaroida (Echinodermata: Echinoidea) of the Caribbean Area. Bulletins of American Paleontology 77(309):1-221

Geologic formations of Cuba
Eocene Series of North America
Paleogene Cuba
Lutetian Stage
Limestone formations
Marl formations
Sandstone formations